is a public museum in Iwakuni, Yamaguchi Prefecture, Japan. Constructed between 1942 and March 1945 for the storage and display of the works of art and craft and historical materials donated by the Kikkawa family, former lords of Iwakuni Domain, the facility first opened in April 1944, operating fully as a museum from the beginning of the 1950s. The main building, by architect , as well as storehouses of 1891 and 1944, are registered Tangible Cultural Properties, while the ancillary building constructed in 1931 as the former Kikkawa family offices in the city is a Prefectural Tangible Cultural Property.

See also

 List of Cultural Properties of Japan - paintings (Yamaguchi)
 Yamaguchi Prefectural Museum and Museum of Art
 Iwakuni Castle, Kintai-kyō
 Kikkawa Historical Museum
 Iwakuni Art Museum

References

External links
  Iwakuni Chōkokan

Iwakuni, Yamaguchi
Museums in Yamaguchi Prefecture
Museums established in 1944
1944 establishments in Japan